My Moment is the debut commercial mixtape by American rapper Tee Grizzley. It was released on April 7, 2017, by 300 Entertainment. The production on the mixtape was handled by DJ Mustard, Helluva, Sonny Digital and Westside Webb.

Track listing
Credits adapted from BMI.

Charts

Weekly charts

Year-end charts

Certifications

References

2017 mixtape albums
Tee Grizzley albums
Albums produced by DJ Mustard
Albums produced by Sonny Digital
Debut mixtape albums